The 1877 North Northamptonshire by-election was fought on 13 August 1877.  The byelection was fought due to the death of the incumbent Conservative MP, George Ward Hunt.  It was won by the Conservative candidate Brownlow Cecil.

References

1877 elections in the United Kingdom
1877 in England
19th century in Northamptonshire
By-elections to the Parliament of the United Kingdom in Northamptonshire constituencies